Loretta Mary Aiken (March 19, 1894 – May 23, 1975), known by her stage name Jackie "Moms" Mabley, was an American stand-up comedian and actress.  Mabley began her career on the theater stage in the 1920s and became a veteran entertainer of the Chitlin' Circuit of African-American vaudeville. Mabley later recorded comedy albums and appeared in films and on television programs including The Ed Sullivan Show and The Smothers Brothers Comedy Hour.

Early life
Loretta Mary Aiken was born in Brevard, North Carolina, on March 19, 1894. She was one of 16 children born to James Aiken and Mary Smith, who had married in 1891. Her father owned and operated several successful businesses, while her mother kept house and took in boarders.

Her childhood was tumultuous. Aiken gave birth to two children resulting from her being raped at age 11, by an elderly black man, and at age 13, by a white sheriff. Both children were placed for adoption.

Career

Early career
At the encouragement of her grandmother, Aiken ran away at age 14 to Cleveland, Ohio, joining a traveling vaudeville-style minstrel show starring Butterbeans and Susie, where she sang and entertained. In 1909, a year after Aiken left, her father was killed when a fire engine exploded while he was volunteering as a firefighter. Her mother took over the family's primary business, a general store. She was killed a few years later, run over by a truck while returning home from church on Christmas Day.

Aiken adopted the stage name Jackie Mabley, borrowing the name of an early boyfriend, Jack Mabley, who was also a performer. She remarked in a 1970 Ebony interview that he had taken so much from her, the least she could do was take his name from him.

Rise to fame

Mabley quickly became one of the most successful entertainers of the Chitlin' Circuit, although, as a black woman, her wages were meager. She made her New York City debut at Connie's Inn in Harlem.

She came out as a lesbian in 1921 at the age of twenty-seven, becoming one of the first openly gay comedians. During the 1920s and 1930s she appeared in androgynous clothing and recorded several "lesbian stand-up" routines.

In April 1939, Mabley became the first female comic to perform at the Apollo theater in Harlem.

During the 1950s, Mabley—influenced by the maternal role she was filling for other comedians on the circuit—adopted the name "Moms" and the appearance of a toothless, bedraggled woman in a house dress and floppy hat. Mabley also credited the name to her grandmother, who had been a driving force in the pursuit of her dreams. The non-threatening persona aided her in addressing topics too edgy for most comics of the time, including racism, sexuality and having children after becoming a widow. A preference for handsome young men rather than "old washed-up geezers" became a signature bit.

In the 1960s, Mabley became known to a wider white audience, playing Carnegie Hall in 1962, and making a number of mainstream TV appearances, with multiple appearances on The Smothers Brothers Comedy Hour. Music became a regular part of her act, and a cover version of "Abraham, Martin and John" hit No. 35 on the Billboard Hot 100 on July 19, 1969, making Mabley, at 75, the oldest living person to have a U.S. Top 40 hit. She played the Harlem Cultural Festival during this time.

Final years
Mabley continued performing in the 1970s. In 1971, she appeared on The Pearl Bailey Show. Later that year, she opened for Ike & Tina Turner at the Greek Theatre and sang a tribute to Louis Armstrong as part of her set. While filming the 1974 film Amazing Grace, her only film starring role, Mabley suffered a heart attack. She returned to work three weeks later, after receiving a pacemaker.

Personal life and demise
Over the course of her life, Mabley had six children: Bonnie, Christine, Charles, and Yvonne Ailey, and two placed for adoption when she was a teenager.

Mabley died from heart failure in White Plains, New York, on May 23, 1975. She is interred at Ferncliff Cemetery, Hartsdale, New York.

Legacy
In 1983 and 1984, Whoopi Goldberg "first came to national prominence with her one-woman show" in which she portrayed Mabley, Moms, first performed in Berkeley, California, and then at the Victoria Theatre in San Francisco; the Oakland Museum of California preserves a poster advertising the show. Mabley was the subject of Whoopi Goldberg Presents Moms Mabley, a documentary film which first aired on HBO on November 18, 2013. The documentary was nominated for two Creative Arts Emmy Awards at the 66th ceremony held on August 16, 2014, at the Nokia Theatre in Downtown Los Angeles: Outstanding Documentary or Nonfiction Special and Outstanding Narrator for Whoopi Goldberg. In 2015, she was named by Equality Forum as one of their 31 Icons of the 2015 LGBT History Month.

Mabley was the inspiration for the character of Grandma Klump in the 1996 movie The Nutty Professor.

Mabley was featured during the "HerStory" video tribute to notable women on U2's tour in 2017 for the 30th anniversary of The Joshua Tree during a performance of "Ultraviolet (Light My Way)" from the band's 1991 album Achtung Baby.

Mabley, portrayed by Wanda Sykes, appears in the final episode of the third season of The Marvelous Mrs. Maisel, performing a full stand-up routine on the Apollo Theater stage.

Work

Stage
 Bowman's Cotton Blossoms (1919)
 Look Who's Here (1927)
 Miss Bandana (1927)
 Fast and Furious (1931)
 Blackberries of 1932 (1932)
 The Joy Boat (1930s)
 Sidewalks of Harlem (1930s)
 Red Pastures (1930s)
 Swingin' the Dream (1939)

Films
 The Emperor Jones (1933)
 Killer Diller (1948)
 Boarding House Blues (1948)
 It's Your Thing (documentary, 1970)
 Amazing Grace (1974)

Television
 The Smothers Brothers Comedy Hour (1967)
 The Ed Sullivan Show (1969)
 The Merv Griffin Show (with guest host Judy Garland, 1969)
 The Bill Cosby Show (1970)
 The Pearl Bailey Show (1971)

Discography
 1961 On Stage
 1961 Moms Mabley at the "UN"
 1961 Moms Mabley at The Playboy Club
 1962 Moms Mabley Breaks It Up
 1962 Moms Mabley at Geneva Conference
 1963 I Got Somethin' to Tell You!
 1963 Young Men, Sí – Old Men, No
 1964 Moms the Word
 1964 Out on a Limb
 1964 The Funny Sides of Moms Mabley (Chess)
 1964 Moms Wows
 1964 Best of Moms and Pigmeat, Vol. 1
 1965 Men in My Life
 1965 Now Hear This
 1966 Moms Mabley at the White House Conference
 1968 Best of Moms Mabley
 1969 The Youngest Teenager
 1969 Her Young Thing
 1970 Live at Sing Sing
 1972 I Like 'em Young
 1994 Live at the Apollo
 1994 The Funny Sides of Moms Mabley (Jewel)
 1994 Live at the Ritz
 2004 Comedy Ain't Pretty

References

External links

 Agitation in Moderation: The Moms Mabley Story by Kliph Nesteroff
 
 
 
 Moms Mabley on MusicMatch (archived)
 Moms Mabley on NPR.org

1894 births
1975 deaths
20th-century American comedians
20th-century American actresses
Actresses from North Carolina
African-American actresses
African-American female comedians
African-American stand-up comedians
American stand-up comedians
American women comedians
Burials at Ferncliff Cemetery
American lesbian actresses
LGBT African Americans
Lesbian comedians
LGBT people from North Carolina
People from Brevard, North Carolina
Vaudeville performers
20th-century African-American women
20th-century African-American people
20th-century American LGBT people
African-American history of Westchester County, New York
American LGBT comedians